Mark Jordon (born 25 January 1965) is an English actor, best known for playing PC Phil Bellamy in the British television series Heartbeat, which he left in 2007. A documentary, Heartbeat - Farewell Phil  was broadcast later on Christmas Day where he was husband to barmaid Gina (Tricia Penrose).

His debut as director came with the short film To The Sea Again, which played in many festivals and made it to the final of the Angel Film Festival London and Moondance International Film Festival in Hollywood.

On 8 July 2014, Jordon joined the cast of  Emmerdale in the short term role of Daz Spencer. He reprised the role in August 2017, becoming a regular cast member, until Daz was written out on 31 January 2019.

Personal life
Jordon married actress Siobhan Finneran in 1997; they divorced in 2014. They have two children together.

Mark's current partner is Emmerdale co-star Laura Norton. On 24 August 2020, it was announced that the couple were expecting their first child. On 29 January 2021, Norton gave birth to a son called Jesse.

In July 2018, he was arrested on suspicion of assault.  In October 2018, he was charged with grievous bodily harm and assault. In November 2018, he pleaded not guilty and was granted unconditional bail until his trial. In August 2019, he was found not guilty of all charges.

Filmography

References

External links

1965 births
Living people
English male soap opera actors
People acquitted of assault
20th-century English male actors
21st-century English male actors
Male actors from Oldham